The Xinjiang goat breed from the mountains of Xinjiang in China is used for the production of milk, cashmere, and meat.

Cross-breeding with the Liaoning Cashmere breed has been found to improve cashmere yield and length at the cost of increased fibre diameter.

See also
Cashmere goat

References

Dairy goat breeds
Meat goat breeds
Fiber-producing goat breeds
Goat breeds originating in China
Goat breeds